Engine House No. 8 may refer to:
 Engine House No. 8 (Baltimore, Maryland)
 Engine House No. 8 (Tacoma, Washington)

See also
Engine House (disambiguation)